Ronny Markes (born April 21, 1988), is a Brazilian mixed martial artist currently competing in the Heavyweight division. A professional competitor since 2007, Markes has formerly competed for the UFC, King of the Cage, PFL, Bellator MMA, and M-1 Global. He is the current King of the Cage Super Heavyweight Champion.

MMA career

Early career
Markes made his professional MMA debut in 2007 at an event in Spain. Markes competed mostly in his native Brazil, with a few early professional fights taking place in Europe.  He amassed an impressive 11-1 prior to signing with Zuffa in 2011.

Ultimate Fighting Championship
Markes signed with the UFC as an injury replacement for Stephan Bonnar against Karlos Vemola at UFC on Versus 5 on August 14, 2011. He won the fight via unanimous decision.

Markes dropped down to the Middleweight division and faced Aaron Simpson on February 15, 2012 at UFC on Fuel TV 1 After being dropped by an uppercut late in the first round Markes overcame adversity and defeated Simpson via split decision.

In his third fight for the promotion, Markes faced Andrew Craig on January 19, 2013 at UFC on FX 7. He won the fight via unanimous decision.

Markes was expected to face Derek Brunson on June 8, 2013 at UFC on Fuel TV 10.  However, the bout was scrapped on the day of the weigh in as Markes was involved in a minor traffic accident.  While Markes was not seriously injured, the incident prevented him from competing.

For his fourth fight with the promotion, Markes faced Yoel Romero on November 6, 2013 at UFC Fight Night 31. He lost the fight via knockout in the third round.

Markes faced Thiago Santos on March 23, 2014 at UFC Fight Night 38. Markes was unable to make weight for this fight. He lost the fight via TKO in the first round, and was subsequently released from the promotion shortly after.

World Series of Fighting
On May 15, 2014 it was announced that Markes had signed a deal with World Series of Fighting and plans to return to the Light Heavyweight division.

Markes was expected to face Kelvin Tiller at World Series of Fighting 12: Palomino vs Gonzalez on August 9, 2014, However Tiller was pulled from the fight to replace injured Krasimir Mladenov Markes instead fought promotional newcomer Cully Butterfield at the event. He won the fight by unanimous decision.

Markes was expected to face Thiago Silva at WSOF 19 on March 28, 2015. However Silva was pulled from the fight to face Matt Hamill at WSOF 19. Matt Hamill was later replaced by Teddy Holder. Markes was then scheduled to face David Branch at WSOF 20 on April 10, 2015 However, on the day of the weigh-in, Markes was forced out of the bout due to dehydration and was replaced by promotional newcomer Jesse McElligott.

Bellator MMA 
Markes was expected to make his Bellator MMA promotional debut against Josh Barnett on December 20, 2019 at Bellator's Salute the Troops event in Honolulu, Hawaii. However, Barnett was deemed unable to compete due to severe illness on the night of the event and the bout was cancelled. The fight was rescheduled for Bellator 241 on March 13, 2020. However, Barnett failed his medical tests and was replaced by Matt Mitrione. However, the whole event was eventually cancelled due to the prevailing COVID-19 pandemic.

Markes made his promotional debut against Linton Vassell at Bellator 254 on December 10, 2020. He lost the fight via TKO in the second round.

Markes faced Said Sowma on July 16, 2021 at Bellator 262. He lost via knockout in the first round.

On July 19, 2021, Bellator MMA officials revealed that Markes was released from the promotion.

Post Bellator 
Markes faced Victor Jones on November 19, 2021 at Premier FC 32 He won by TKO 21 seconds in to the first round.

Markes faced Rodrigo Duarte on December 18, 2021 at Shooto Brasil 110. He won the bout via kimura in the first round.

Markes was scheduled to face Reggie Peña at Eagle FC 46 on March 11, 2022. The day of the event, the bout was delayed and will likely happen at a future event. The bout eventually took place on May 20, 2022 at Eagle FC 47. Markes won the fight via stoppage after Pena injured his knee in the second round.

Markes faced Szymon Bajor on August 13, 2022 at PFL 8. Markes lost the bout via unanimous decision.

Championships and accomplishments
King of the Cage
KOTC Super Heavyweight Championship (One time)

Mixed martial arts record

|-
|Loss
|align=center|22–10
|Szymon Bajor
|Decision (unanimous)
|PFL 8
|
|align=center|3
|align=center|5:00
|Cardiff, Wales
|
|-
| Win
| align=center|22–9
| Reggie Peña
|TKO (knee injury) 
| Eagle FC 47
| 
| align=center|2
| align=center|1:21
| Miami, Florida, United States
|
|-
| Win
| align=center|21–9 
| Rodrigo Duarte
| Submission (kimura)
| Shooto Brasil 110
| 
| align=center|1
| align=center|3:23
| Rio de Janeiro, Brazil
|
|-
| Win
| align=center|20–9 
| Victor Jones
| TKO (punches)
| Premier FC 32
| 
| align=center|1
| align=center|0:21
| Springfield, Massachusetts, United States
|
|-
| Loss
| align=center|19–9
| Said Sowma
| KO (punches)
| Bellator 262
| 
| align=center|1
| align=center|1:09
| Uncasville, Connecticut, United States
|
|-
| Loss
| align=center|19–8
| Linton Vassell
| TKO (punches)
| Bellator 254
| 
| align=center|2
| align=center|3:37
| Uncasville, Connecticut, United States
| 
|-
| Win
| align=center|19–7 
| Sigi Pesaleli
| TKO (punches)
| PFL 3
| 
| align=center| 2
| align=center| 3:44
| Uniondale, New York, United States
| 
|-
| Loss
| align=center|18–7
| Brandon Halsey	
| Decision (unanimous)
| PFL 9
| 
| align=center| 2
| align=center| 5:00
| Long Beach, California, United States
| 
|-
| Loss
| align=center|18–6
| Sean O'Connell
| TKO (punches)
| PFL 2
| 
| align=center|2
| align=center|0:41
| Chicago, Illinois, United States
|
|-
| Win
| align=center | 18–5
| Dylan Potter
| Submission (arm-triangle choke)
| KOTC: Fractured
| 
| align=center | 1
| align=center | 2:29
| Lincoln City, Oregon, United States
|
|-
| Win
| align=center | 17–5
| Smealinho Rama
| Decision (unanimous)
| PFL Daytona
| 
| align=center | 3
| align=center | 5:00
| Daytona Beach, Florida, United States
|
|-
| Loss
| align=center | 16–5
| Viktor Nemkov
| Submission (guillotine choke)
| M-1 Challenge 77: Nemkov vs. Markes
| 
| align=center | 1
| align=center | 2:06
| Sochi, Russia
| 
|-
| Win
| align=center | 16–4
| Tony Lopez
| Submission (arm-triangle choke)
| KOTC: Heavy Trauma
| 
| align=center | 1
| align=center | 3:03
| Lincoln City, Oregon, United States
| 
|-
| Loss
| align=center | 15–4
| Cassio Barbosa de Oliveira
| Submission (heel hook)
| Shooto: Brazil 61
| 
| align=center | 1
| align=center | 1:47
| Rio de Janeiro, Brazil
|
|-
| Win
| align=center | 15–3
| Cully Butterfield
| Decision (unanimous)
| WSOF 12
| 
| align=center | 3
| align=center | 5:00
| Las Vegas, Nevada, United States
| 
|-
| Loss
| align=center | 14–3
| Thiago Santos
| TKO (body kick and punches)
| UFC Fight Night: Shogun vs. Henderson 2
| 
| align=center | 1
| align=center | 0:53
| Natal, Brazil
| 
|-
| Loss
| align=center | 14–2
| Yoel Romero
| KO (punches)
| UFC: Fight for the Troops 3
| 
| align=center | 3
| align=center | 1:39
| Fort Campbell, Kentucky, United States
|
|-
| Win
| align=center | 14–1
| Andrew Craig
| Decision (unanimous)
| UFC on FX: Belfort vs. Bisping
| 
| align=center | 3
| align=center | 5:00
| São Paulo, Brazil
|
|-
| Win
| align=center | 13–1
| Aaron Simpson
| Decision (split)
| UFC on Fuel TV: Sanchez vs. Ellenberger
| 
| align=center | 3
| align=center | 5:00
| Omaha, Nebraska, United States
| 
|-
| Win
| align=center | 12–1
| Karlos Vémola
| Decision (unanimous)
| UFC Live: Hardy vs. Lytle
| 
| align=center | 3
| align=center | 5:00
| Milwaukee, Wisconsin, United States
|
|-
| Win
| align=center | 11–1
| Paulo Filho
| Decision (unanimous)
| International Fighter Championship
| 
| align=center | 3
| align=center | 5:00
| Recife, Pernambuco, Brazil
|
|-
| Win
| align=center | 10–1
| Diogo Osama
| TKO (punches)
| Shooto: Brazil 22
| 
| align=center | 1
| align=center | 0:45
| Brasilia, Brazil
|
|-
| Win
| align=center | 9–1
| Wendres Carlos da Silva
| TKO (submission to punches)
| Gouveia Fight Championship 2
| 
| align=center | 3
| align=center | 4:57
| Natal, Rio Grande do Norte, Brazil
|
|-
| Win
| align=center | 8–1
| Fernando Silva
| TKO (punches)
| Brazil Fight 3: Minas Gerais vs. São Paulo
| 
| align=center | 1
| align=center | 3:08
| Belo Horizonte, Minas Gerais, Brazil
|
|-
| Loss
| align=center | 7–1
| Paulo Rodrigues
| Submission (armbar)
| Iron Man Championship 7
| 
| align=center | 1
| align=center | 4:43
| Belém, Pará, Brazil
|
|-
| Win
| align=center | 7–0
| Fernando Almeida
| TKO (punches)
| Amazon Show Combat
| 
| align=center | 1
| align=center | N/A
| Manaus, Amazonas, Brazil
|
|-
| Win
| align=center | 6–0
| Wanderlan Vila Cruzeiro
| TKO (punches)
| Shooto: Brazil 16
| 
| align=center | 1
| align=center | N/A
| Rio de Janeiro, Brazil
|
|-
| Win
| align=center | 5–0
| Roque Oliver
| Submission (arm-triangle choke)
| Platinum Fight Brazil 2
| 
| align=center | 1
| align=center | 2:42
| Rio de Janeiro, Brazil
|
|-
| Win
| align=center | 4–0
| Charles Andrade
| Submission (kimura)
| Natal Fight Championship 2
| 
| align=center | 1
| align=center | 3:56
| Natal, Rio Grande do Norte, Brazil
|
|-
| Win
| align=center | 3–0
| Michael Knaap
| Decision (unanimous)
| BG: Top Team
| 
| align=center | 3
| align=center | 5:00
| Beverwijk, Netherlands
|
|-
| Win
| align=center | 2–0
| Junior Fofinho
| Submission (arm-triangle choke)
| Platinum Fight Brazil
| 
| align=center | 1
| align=center | 0:28
| Natal, Rio Grande do Norte, Brazil
|
|-
| Win
| align=center | 1–0
| Enrico Vaccaro
| TKO (punches)
| KO: Arena 6
| 
| align=center | 2
| align=center | 1:05
| Spain
|
|-

See also
 List of male mixed martial artists

References

External links
 
 

Brazilian male mixed martial artists
Light heavyweight mixed martial artists
Living people
1988 births
People from Natal, Rio Grande do Norte
Middleweight mixed martial artists
Mixed martial artists utilizing Brazilian jiu-jitsu
Brazilian practitioners of Brazilian jiu-jitsu
People awarded a black belt in Brazilian jiu-jitsu
Ultimate Fighting Championship male fighters
Sportspeople from Rio Grande do Norte